Fat Shack is an American fast-casual restaurant chain founded in Fort Collins, Colorado. As of September 2022, it has 29 corporate and franchise-owned restaurants across twelve states with a new location in Kansas City, Missouri set to open in 2022. The new location will be Fat Shack’s first restaurant in Missouri.

History

Origins 
The Fat Shack concept was copied from the Rutgers grease trucks in February 2010 by Tom Armenti in the college town of Ewing, New Jersey (home of The College of New Jersey), operating from 6 pm to 4 am in a bagel shop (which operated at the location during the day time). Once the bagel shop's staff left for the day, Tom would re-open the store and operate his new late night restaurant from 6PM to 4AM.

In August 2011, Armenti moved to Fort Collins, Colorado where he opened the doors to the first full-size Fat Shack restaurant.

Growth 

Armenti's college classmate and close friend, Kevin Gabauer joined the company in Fort Collins and worked with the founder to re-organize the menu, refreshing the company's brand and simplifying operations. Within six months, Fat Shack opened another location in Boulder.

In February 2015, Fat Shack celebrated the grand opening of its first franchise in Denver at DU. After opening several more locations in Colorado, interstate expansion began in Denton, Texas. Fat Shack now has 28 locations throughout the United States, including delivery-only virtual kitchen concepts in Chicago and Philadelphia.

Shark Tank appearance 

In May 2019, Armenti and Gabauer appeared on the Season 10 finale of the ABC program Shark Tank. The sharks were impressed by Fat Shack's $22 million in lifetime sales. The duo struck a deal with investor Mark Cuban for $250,000 for 15% of the company. Overnight, the team received hundreds of franchise requests, and had accumulated over 3,000 within 48 hours of their episode airing.

Menu 
From the beginning, the staples of Fat Shack's menu has been their 'Fat Sandwiches', which draw their origins from the Grease trucks at Rutgers University, burgers, deep-fried desserts, chicken wings, and philly cheesesteaks. Other offerings include milkshakes, mozzarella sticks and deep-fried mac and cheese. The restaurants often offer seasonal items such as deep-fried mint Oreos during the month of March. Many offerings surpass daily recommended intake of calories with some ranging upwards of 2,000 Calories.

References

External links 
 

Restaurant chains